The second season of the reality television series Love & Hip Hop: Atlanta aired on VH1 from April 22, 2013 until August 12, 2013. The show was primarily filmed in Atlanta, Georgia. It was executive produced by Mona Scott-Young for Monami Entertainment, Toby Barraud and Stefan Springman for NFGTV, and Shelly Tatro, Brad Abramson, Danielle Gelfand and Jeff Olde for VH1. Carlos King served as co-executive producer.

The series chronicles the lives of several women and men in the Atlanta area, involved in hip hop music. It consists of 17 episodes, including a two-part reunion special hosted by Mona Scott Young.

Production
On April 1, 2013, VH1 announced that Love & Hip Hop: Atlanta would be returning for a second season on April 22, 2013. All main cast members from the previous season returned. Radio personality Traci Steele was added to the main cast, while her former boyfriend DJ Babey Drew joined the supporting cast.

The season was released on DVD in region 1 on September 11, 2014.

Synopsis
Joseline strives to reclaim her independence from Stevie. Erica's engagement to Scrappy hits the skids, as her tensions with Momma Dee explode. K. Michelle's beef with the other ladies threatens to derail her career. Rasheeda discovers she is pregnant and the news reveals a whole new side to Kirk. Mimi has a new man. Traci and her baby daddy Drew struggle to find common ground.

Reception
The show's ratings continued to grow, with an average of 3.27 million viewers per episode.

Cast

Starring

 Joseline Hernandez (17 episodes)
 Erica Dixon (15 episodes)
 Rasheeda (14 episodes)
 K. Michelle (16 episodes)
 Traci Steele (14 episodes)
 Karlie Redd (11 episodes)
 Mimi Faust (17 episodes)

Also starring

 Stevie J (17 episodes)
 Lil Scrappy (16 episodes)
 Shay Johnson (9 episodes)
 Momma Dee (13 episodes)
 Benzino (12 episodes)
 Ariane Davis (14 episodes)
 DJ Babey Drew (11 episodes)
 Kirk Frost (15 episodes)

Erica's mother Mingnon Dixon, Dawn Heflin, Nikko London, Stevie J's artist Che Mack, Shirleen Harvell and Traci's boyfriend DaShaun Johnson appear as guest stars in several episodes. The show features minor appearances from notable figures within the hip hop industry and Atlanta's social scene, including Stevie J and Mimi's daughter Eva Jordan, Erica Pinkett, Nikko's friend Johnny Crome, Deb Antney, Bobby V, Bambi, Kirk's jacuzzi fling Mary Jane, Stevie J's father Moses Jordan and Beenie Man.

Episodes

Music
Several cast members had their music featured on the show and released singles to coincide with the airing of the episodes.

References

External links

2013 American television seasons
Love & Hip Hop